Serra del Tallat is a mountain range of the Catalan Central Depression, Catalonia, Spain. It has an elevation of 802 metres above sea level.

The highest summit of the Serra del Tallat is the Tossal Gros de Vallbona; it is located between the municipal limits of Espluga de Francolí, Conca de Barberà and Vallbona de les Monges, Urgell.

See also
Catalan Central Depression
Mountains of Catalonia

References

Tallat
Conca de Barberà